The 2021 New Mexico State Aggies football team represented New Mexico State University in the 2021 NCAA Division I FBS football season. The Aggies were led by ninth–year head coach Doug Martin and played their home games at Aggie Memorial Stadium. They competed as an independent.

Previous season
The Aggies finished the 2020 season 1–1. The Aggies opted out on the 2020 fall season and played the 2021 spring season.

Schedule

AggieVision games air on KVIA-TV, BSAZ, FloFootball, & Comcast.

Personnel

Depth chart

Game summaries

UTEP

at San Diego State

at New Mexico

South Carolina State

Hawaii

at San Jose State

at Nevada

at Hawaii

Utah State

at No. 2 Alabama

at Kentucky

UMass

References

New Mexico State
New Mexico State Aggies football seasons
New Mexico State Aggies football